Saint Everild of Everingham was an Anglo-Saxon saint of the 7th century who founded a convent at Everingham, in the English county of the East Riding of Yorkshire. All we know of her comes from the York Breviary.

There are two churches dedicated to St Everilda: St Everilda's Church, Nether Poppleton, and Ss Mary & Everilda, Everingham.

She was converted to Christianity by Saint Birinus, along with King Cynegils of Wessex, in 635. Her legend in the York Breviary states that she was of the Wessex nobility.  She fled from home to become a nun, and was joined by Saints Bega and Wuldreda.  Saint Wilfrid of York made them all nuns at a place called the Bishop's Dwelling, later known as Everildisham.  This place has been identified with present-day Everingham.  She gathered a large community of some eighty women.

Veneration
Her name appears in the Martyrology of Usuard as well as in the church calendars of York and Northumbria.

Her feast day is 9 July.

Notes

External links
"St. Everildis, Virgin, in England", Butler's Lives of the Saints
Saints of July 9: Everild of Everingham
St. Everild of Everingham
Catholic Online entry

Converts to Christianity from pagan religions
West Saxon saints
Northumbrian saints
Anglo-Saxon nuns
History of the East Riding of Yorkshire
Christianity in the East Riding of Yorkshire
Yorkshire saints
7th-century Christian saints
Female saints of medieval England
7th-century English nuns